Sonia Vihar  is a north-east suburb of Delhi near Wazirabad on the bank of the river Yamuna. To the rest of Delhi citizens, it is known for its water treatment plant which supplies potable water to several parts of Delhi. It lies in Karawal Nagar assembly area.

Transportation and access
Sonia Vihar is situated at a distance of about 26 km from the Indira Gandhi International Airport, 13 km from the New Delhi railway station and 10 km from Delhi Railway station. The nearest Metro station is Vishvavidyala Metro station, 4 km away. City public buses of Delhi Transport Corporation connect it to other parts of Delhi.

Places
Sonia Vihar is divided into Blocks and Pustas (pushta means embankment along the river) like A, B, C, D, E, F & G Blocks which also named as 1, 2, 3, 4 as G-1, G-2, G-3, G-4 Blocks and Zero, 1st, 2nd, 3rd, 4th and 5th Pusta. Sonia Vihar is thickly populated. Merchants, workers, and clerks from all parts of India, particularly Bihar and eastern Uttar Pradesh, live in this area.

It has many good schools like sunrise public school, Swarn Bharti Public School, Sahu International Public School,jps public school,sahu international school, Green Day Public School, Elite International Public School, Govt. Boys Senior Secondary School, Child world public school, Bhartividhya public school B.R model public school,(located at pusta) & many other important Educational centres. Shyam Vatika & Rati Ram Vatika are the famous marriage places. Aggarwal sweets corner, Bikaner Sweets, balaji Mandir, Annpurnna Mandir, Shri Aadi Shakti Balaji Sai Mandir and Radha swami satsang vyash are the popular places in Sonia Vihar. There are many beautiful parks in Sonia Vihar on each Pusta. Social & Transportation for Sonia Vihar KNPSS Team.

Sonia Vihar has many nice places and temples to visit. "Second Pusta" is the most popular market in this area. Annapurna Temple is a local temple. The banks in this area are Punjab National Bank & Indian Bank which are on First Pusta. There is lots of financial institutions/Societies for financial help The Purvanchal Co-op urban T/C Ltd. & The Sahukar Co-op urban T/C Ltd and many others. 
Chhath Pooja is one of the major festivals celebrated near the Yamuna bank of Sonia Vihar. All Other festivals of different communities are also celebrated time to time.

Water treatment plant
Sonia Vihar water treatment plant of Delhi Jal Board has been functioning since 2006. It gets 80 cusecs of water from Upper Ganga Canal north of Muradnagar through large conduit pipes and treats the raw water to supply potable water to several parts of Delhi.

References

External links 
 Sonia Vihar Map
 About Sonia Vihar
 Cluster Bus Services in Sonia Vihar
 Signature Bridge

Cities and towns in North East Delhi district